The Catholic Church in Hong Kong, established in 1841, is part of the worldwide Catholic Church, under the spiritual leadership of the Pope in Rome. All Catholics in Hong Kong are under the Diocese of Hong Kong, which is a de jure suffragan diocese of the Archdiocese of Guangzhou. However, in practice it is an immediate subject of the Holy See.

There are approximately 389,000 Catholics in Hong Kong - around 5% of the total population - most being Latin Rite Catholics. The majority of the Hong Kong Catholics are Chinese. However, there are various national groups of Filipino, Korean, Japanese, Indian, French and German active Catholics. Sunday religious services are offered in 99 places, and there are 249 Catholic schools and 199 various social service centres.

The Bishop emeritus of Hong Kong is Joseph Cardinal Zen Ze-kiun, SDB.  He is regarded by some to be politically 'controversial' due to his 'anti-Beijing' views and his strong ties with the pro-democracy camp. However, Zen has constantly personally maintained that he is very patriotic to his country, and that he has been upset that he has been denied the right to return to China.

The Bishop of Hong Kong is Stephen Chow, SJ who was appointed by Pope Francis in 2021. He took over from Cardinal John Tong Hon who served as Apostolic Administrator following the death of Michael Yeung Ming-cheung in 2019.

The Cathedral of the Diocese of Hong Kong is the Cathedral of the Immaculate Conception, located on Caine Road, Mid Levels.

Political
Traditionally, Catholics in Hong Kong tend to support the pro-democracy camp, despite there also being many Catholics supporting the pro-Beijing camp. Former Chief Executive of Hong Kong Donald Tsang and Carrie Lam, and current Chief Executive of Hong Kong John Lee are Catholics.

In July 2022, the Vatican's unofficial representative in Hong Kong, monsignor Javier Herrera-Corona, warned that religious freedoms were over in Hong Kong due to pressure from mainland Chinese authorities, with one person summarizing the monsignor's message as "Hong Kong is not the great Catholic beachhead it was."

See also

 Christianity in Hong Kong
 Catholic Church in China
 Catholic Church in Macau
 Catholic Church in Taiwan
 Roman Catholic Diocese of Hong Kong
 List of Catholic Churches in Hong Kong

Footnotes

References
Catholic Diocese in Hong Kong

 
Hong Kong